Eau Galle may refer to any of the following places in Wisconsin:

 Eau Galle, St. Croix County, Wisconsin, a town
 Eau Galle, Dunn County, Wisconsin, a town
 Eau Galle (community), Dunn County, Wisconsin, an unincorporated community
 Eau Galle River

See also 
 Eau Gallie, Florida
 Eau Gallee, Haiti, saltwater lake AKA Trou Caïman